Bernheze is a municipality in the southern Netherlands, in the province of North Brabant. It was formed as a rename of Heesch in 1995. The municipalities of Heeswijk-Dinther and Nistelrode had merged into Heesch in 1994.

Etymology
The municipality was named after an old farm "Bernhese", which came into the possession of the Berne Abbey. This abbey was situated in the village of Bern. The meaning of 'Bernhese' is twofold: 'Bern' is the same as the old-Dutch word 'born', that means 'water' or 'well'. 'Hese' means bush or forest.  In 1857 the Berne Abbey was founded in Heeswijk.

Population centres

Topography

Dutch Topographic map of the municipality of Bernheze, June 2015.

Notable people 
 Marco Verkuylen (born 1967 in Heeswijk-Dinther) a Dutch electronic music DJ who works as Marco V
 Loek van Wely (born 1972 in Heesch) a Dutch chess player and politician

Sport 
 Kirsten van de Ven (born 1985 in Heesch) a former Dutch professional footballer
 Raymon van der Biezen (born 1987 in Heesch) a Dutch BMX racer, competed in the 2008 and 2012 Summer Olympics
 Dave van der Burg (born 1993 in Heesch) a Dutch male BMX rider, qualified for the 2020 Summer Olympics
 Vincent Janssen (born 1994 in Heesch) a Dutch professional footballer who plays in Mexico
 Sjef van den Berg (born 1995 in Heeswijk-Dinther) a Dutch competitive archer, competed at the 2016 Summer Olympics

Gallery

References

External links

Official website

 
Municipalities of North Brabant
Municipalities of the Netherlands established in 1995